Saxidomus purpurata, or purple butter clam, is a species of large edible saltwater clams, marine bivalve mollusks in the family Veneridae, the Venus clams. It is found in the northwest Pacific Ocean near China and Japan from 0–20 metres deep.

References

External links
 
 

purpurata
Bivalves described in 1852